The Normandin River is a tributary of the north shore of Ashuapmushuan Lake, flowing into the unorganized territory of Lac-Ashuapmushuan, Quebec, into the Regional County Municipality (RCM) of Le Domaine-du-Roy, in the administrative region of Saguenay-Lac-Saint-Jean, in Quebec, in Canada.

This river crosses successively the cantons of Ventadour, Buade, Poutrincourt, Bouteroue, Ducharme, Aigremont and Grahamé. Forestry is the main economic activity of the sector; recreational tourism activities, second.

The southern part of the Normandin River Valley is served by route 212 which connects Obedjiwan, Quebec to La Tuque and passes south of Dubois Lake and Normandin Lake (Normandin River). From there, the forest road R0212 (East-West direction) cuts the course of the Normandin River.

The surface of the Normandin River is usually frozen from early November to mid-May, however, safe ice circulation is generally from mid-November to mid-April.

Geography

Toponymy 
The term "Normandin" is a family name of French origin.

The toponym "Normandin River" was formalized on December 5, 1968, at the Commission de toponymie du Québec, when it was created.

Notes and references

See also 

Rivers of Saguenay–Lac-Saint-Jean
Le Domaine-du-Roy Regional County Municipality